Iván René Valenciano Pérez (born 18 March 1972) is a Colombian former professional footballer who played as forward. He is the second top goalscorer of all-time in the Colombian Primera A with 217 goals, behind Argentine Sergio Galván Rey, who surpasses him with 224 goals.

During his first spell at Atlético Junior, he scored many goals and was visibly overweight. Due to this, he earned the nickname "El Gordito de Oro" (The Golden Fat Man).

Club career

Junior
Valenciano was born in Barranquilla. He debuted as a professional player in the Junior from Barranquilla, on 23 October 1988 in a match against Independiente Santa Fe played in Bogotá, in which he scored a goal. Since then, there would be the beginning of a long history of goals that covered two decades – he was the top goal scorer for Junior six times. 
In 1991, only being 19 years old, he scored 30 goals, winning his first Golden Boot award.

Atalanta (Italy)
He participated in the Italian Serie A in 1992, playing for Atalanta, where he was unable to score a goal, though he was assigned a goal erroneously. Due to his underperformance, he returned to Barranquilla in the middle of the following year.

Junior
In 1993, playing for Junior, he won his first title and was the team's top scorer with 18 goals. He then won his second Golden Boot award in 94–95 season, in which Junior won its fourth domestic title, scoring 24 goals in 30 matches. In the season 95–96, he scored 36 goals, breaking his own record and winning another Golden Boot award, the last of the three he won during his football career in Colombia.

Veracruz
Valenciano was signed for Mexican club Tiburones Rojos de Veracruz. In the 1996–97 season, he made his debut in a match against Potros de Hierro from Atlante, to which he scored a goal on his debut. He then had an injury to his knee during a match against Panzas Verdes from León, leaving him out of the field for about 2 or 3 months. Given the relegation of his team, he was signed by Monarcas Morelia for which he played from 1997 to 1999. He then returned to Colombia.

Return to Colombia
In Colombia, besides Junior, he played for Deportivo Unicosta, Independiente Medellín, Atlético Bucaramanga, Deportivo Cali, Millonarios, Unión Magdalena, Deportes Quindío and Alianza Petrolera.

Farewell Match
On 11 July 2009, a testimonial match was carried out for Iván René Valenciano in the Roberto Meléndez Stadium. For the friendly match,
many recognised football players were invited such as the Dutch player Edgar Davids, the Chilean Iván Zamorano, the Uruguayan Paolo Montero, the Argentinian Sergio Goycochea, and the Colombians Carlos Valderrama, Faustino Asprilla, Arnoldo Iguarán, Mauricio Serna, Víctor Hugo Aristizábal,  among others. The match ended up with an 8–7 win for the foreign team and Valenciano scoring two goals.

International career
He played for the Colombia national football team and was a participant at the 1992 Summer Olympics and at the 1994 FIFA World Cup. For the national team he scored 13 goals in 29 games between 1991 and 2000. He made his debut for the national side on 15 July 1991 at the 1991 Copa América, when he replaced Arnoldo Iguarán in the 78th minute.

Career statistics

Club

International
Scores and results list Colombia's goal tally first, score column indicates score after each Valenciano goal.

References

1972 births
Living people
Sportspeople from Barranquilla
Association football forwards
Colombian footballers
Colombia under-20 international footballers
Colombia international footballers
1994 FIFA World Cup players
Footballers at the 1992 Summer Olympics
Olympic footballers of Colombia
1991 Copa América players
Categoría Primera A players
Categoría Primera B players
Serie A players
Liga MX players
Campeonato Brasileiro Série A players
Ecuadorian Serie A players
Atlético Junior footballers
Atalanta B.C. players
C.D. Veracruz footballers
Atlético Morelia players
Independiente Medellín footballers
Atlético Bucaramanga footballers
Sociedade Esportiva do Gama players
Deportivo Cali footballers
Millonarios F.C. players
Real Cartagena footballers
Unión Magdalena footballers
Deportes Quindío footballers
C.D. Olmedo footballers
Centauros Villavicencio footballers
Valledupar F.C. footballers
Alianza Petrolera players
Colombian expatriate footballers
Colombian expatriate sportspeople in Italy
Expatriate footballers in Italy
Colombian expatriate sportspeople in Brazil
Expatriate footballers in Brazil
Colombian expatriate sportspeople in Mexico
Expatriate footballers in Mexico
Colombian expatriate sportspeople in Ecuador
Expatriate footballers in Ecuador